Dov Jaron is an American engineer, currently the Calhoun Distinguished Professor of Engineering in Medicine at Drexel University and is a Fellow of Institute of Electrical and Electronics Engineers, American Association for the Advancement of Science, Academy of Surgical Research, American Institute of Medical and Biological Engineering and World Academy for Biomedical Technology.

Education 
In 1967, he received his PhD degree in Biomedical Engineering from the University of Pennsylvania.

References

Year of birth missing (living people)
Living people
Drexel University faculty
21st-century American engineers